The 2013 3 Hours of Imola was an auto racing event held at the Autodromo Enzo e Dino Ferrari, Imola, Italy on 17–18 May 2013, and served as the second round of the 2013 European Le Mans Series season.  Defending ELMS champions Pierre Thiriet and Mathias Beche of Thiriet by TDS Racing won the race over the Signatech Alpine.  Paul-Loup Chatin and Gary Hirsch held the LMPC category lead from start to finish, while Johnny Mowlem and Matt Griffin earned RAM Racing their first victory in only their second LMGTE race.  Fabio Babini, Viktor Shaitar, and Kirill Ladygin won the GTC class on their debut.

Qualifying

Qualifying result
Pole position winners in each class are marked in bold.

  - The No. 68 and No. 72 Ferraris had qualifying laps eliminated by stewards decision.

Race

Race result
Class winners in bold.  Cars failing to complete 70% of winner's distance marked as Not Classified (NC).

References

Imola
Imola